Where Romance Rides is a 1925 American silent Western film directed by Ward Hayes and starring Dick Hatton, Marilyn Mills and Roy Laidlaw.

Synopsis
A wealthy New York banker and his daughter take a vacation in the West. While there she is rescued by a local ranch hand acting as a guide.

Cast
 Dick Hatton as Dick Manners
 Marilyn Mills as Muriel Thompson
 Roy Laidlaw as Andrew J. Thompson
 Jack Richardson as Dave Colton
 Garry O'Dell as Thomas Lapsley 
 Arthur Johnson as Walrus McNutt
 Archie Ricks as 'Dunk' Gresham
 Clara Morris as Imogene Harris

References

Bibliography
 Connelly, Robert B. The Silents: Silent Feature Films, 1910-36, Volume 40, Issue 2. December Press, 1998.
 Langman, Larry. A Guide to Silent Westerns. Greenwood Publishing Group, 1992.
 Munden, Kenneth White. The American Film Institute Catalog of Motion Pictures Produced in the United States, Part 1. University of California Press, 1997.

External links
 

1925 films
1925 Western (genre) films
1920s English-language films
American silent feature films
Silent American Western (genre) films
American black-and-white films
Films directed by Ward Hayes
Arrow Film Corporation films
1920s American films